Ullur is a census town in Thanjavur district in the Indian state of Tamil Nadu.

Demographics
 India census, Ullur had a population of 7779. Males constitute 50% of the population and females 50%. Ullur has an average literacy rate of 80%, higher than the national average of 59.5%: male literacy is 85%, and female literacy is 75%. In Ullur, 10% of the population is under 6 years of age.

References

Cities and towns in Thanjavur district